Emily Jane Mercer Elphinstone Petty-Fitzmaurice, Marchioness of Lansdowne and 8th Lady Nairne (16 May 1819 – 26 June 1895) was a British peeress.

Born in Edinburgh, Emily Jane de Flahaut was the eldest daughter of the French Army general and statesman, Count Charles de Flahaut by his wife, Countess Margaret, Baroness Keith (in her own right).

Her half-brother was Charles, duc de Morny, the half-brother of Emperor Napoleon III through her stepmother, Queen Hortense de Beauharnais.  She was also a granddaughter of Talleyrand. 

On 1 November 1843, at the British embassy in Vienna, she married Henry Petty-Fitzmaurice, Earl of Shelburne (becoming styled Countess of Shelburne). They had three children:

Hon. Henry Charles Keith (1845–1927) later Earl of Shelburne, before succeeding as 5th Marquess of Lansdowne 
Hon. Edmond George (1846–1935), styled Lord Edmond Petty-Fitzmaurice, until being created Baron Fitzmaurice 
Lady Emily Louisa Anne (1855–1939), married The Hon. Everard Charles Digby (a son of Edward, 9th Baron Digby), leaving issue.

In 1863, her husband inherited his father's marquessate, whereby she became Marchioness of Lansdowne. Although she was unable to inherit her mother's title "Baroness Keith" as remainder was restricted to male heirs of her mother (of which there were none), she was, however, recognised by the House of Lords as the 8th Lady Nairne in 1874, her mother having inherited the title from the latter's cousin in 1837 (although Margaret, Baroness Keith did not attempt to claim this title during her lifetime).

On her death at Meikleour House in 1895, her family title of Nairne devolved upon her eldest son.

In 1834, when she was aged only 15, Frédéric Chopin published his Boléro, Op. 19, with a dedication to her.

Further reading
 Scarisbrick, Diana, Margaret de Flahaut (1788–1867): A Scotswoman at the French Court, John Adamson, Cambridge (2019)

References

Notes

1819 births
1895 deaths
Nobility from Edinburgh
Daughters of barons
British marchionesses
Nairne, Emily Petty-Fitzmaurice, 8th Lady
Hereditary women peers
Emily